Pamela Benítez (born May 9, 1991) is a female swimmer from El Salvador. She was the country's flagbearer in the Open Ceremonies of the 2010 Central American and Caribbean Games.

She has swum for El Salvador at the:
World Championships: 2007 and 2009
Pan American Games: 2007
Central American & Caribbean Games: 2006 and 2010

At the 2010 Central American and Caribbean Games, she won three bronze medals (in the 200, 400 and 800 freestyles).

At the 2010 Central American Games, she was El Salvadores' most decorated athlete, winning 8 gold medals.

She joined the Southern Illinois Salukis swimming team for the Spring 2012 season and inspired all. She won 12 of her first 13 races and was a Missouri Valley Conference first-team All-Conference selection.

Benitez represented El Salvador in the 2012 London Olympic Games, swimming the 800-meter freestyle.

Pam is in the hearts and mind of all SIU swimmers.

References

1991 births
Living people
Salvadoran female swimmers
Salvadoran female freestyle swimmers
Swimmers at the 2007 Pan American Games
Olympic swimmers of El Salvador
Swimmers at the 2012 Summer Olympics
Pan American Games competitors for El Salvador
Central American and Caribbean Games bronze medalists for El Salvador
Competitors at the 2006 Central American and Caribbean Games
Competitors at the 2010 Central American and Caribbean Games
Central American and Caribbean Games medalists in swimming

People from San Salvador